Kevin Freeman may refer to:

 Kevin Freeman (equestrian) (1941 – 2023), American equestrian
 Kevin Freeman (business leader), American fund manager and author
 Kevin Freeman (basketball) (born 1978), retired American basketball player
 Kevin Freeman, fictional character in Terinu comics series